James Hunt (1947–1993) was a British racing driver.

James or Jim Hunt may also refer to:
Jim Hunt (born 1937), governor of North Carolina
James Hunt (sailor) (born 1936), American sailor, Olympic champion in 1960
James Hunt (judge) (1943–2006), judge of the High Court of England and Wales
James Hunt (footballer) (born 1976), English footballer
James B. Hunt (1799–1857), Michigan politician
James Sidney Hunt (1859–1901), Anglo-Australian surgeon and scientist
Jim Hunt (columnist) (1926–2006), sportswriter from Toronto 
Jim Lee Hunt (1938–1975), American football defensive tackle
Jimmy Hunt (born 1939), American actor
Leigh Hunt (James Henry Leigh Hunt, 1784–1859), English critic, essayist, poet and writer
James Ramsay Hunt (1872–1937), American neurologist
James I. Hunt, in 108th Ohio General Assembly
James Hunt (speech therapist) (1833–1869), speech therapist and founder of the Anthropological Society of London, England 
James Hunt (Canadian politician) (1835–1915), Canadian politician
James W. Hunt, American computer scientist and inventor
James Husey-Hunt (1853–1924), English cricketer
Jim Hunt (trainer) (1903–1999), American athletic trainer
Jim Hunt (ice hockey), American ice hockey coach
Jim Hunt (coach), cross-country and track and field coach

See also 
 Jamie Hunt (disambiguation)